Francis Pettit Bundy (September 1, 1910, Columbus, Ohio – February 23, 2008, Lebanon, Ohio) was an American physicist, known as a member of General Electric's team of researchers that in December 1954 created diamond chips by applying ultra high pressure (65 kbar) to graphite with iron sulfide as a catalyst.

Biography
Bundy graduated in 1927 from Lancaster, Ohio's Lancaster High School and in 1931 from Westerfield, Ohio's Otterbein College, now named Otterbein University. In 1937 he received his Ph.D. in physics from Ohio State University. From 1937 to 1942 he taught at Ohio University. During World War II he worked in sonar research at the Harvard Underwater Sound Laboratory. In 1946 he went to General Electric's research laboratories in Schenectady, New York.

In 1951 General Electric started "Project Superpressure", managed by Anthony J. Nerad, to synthesize diamonds in the laboratory. In February 1955, General Electric announced that the research team consisting of Francis P. Bundy, H. Tracy Hall, Herbert M. Strong, and Robert H. Wentorf Jr. had synthesized "tiny diamonds made from a carbonaceous material subjected to extreme pressures and temperature." In 1977 the four team members jointly received the International Prize for New Materials, now called the James C. McGroddy Prize for New Materials, for "their outstanding research contributions and inventions which include the first reproducible process for making diamond; the synthesis of cubic boron nitride; and the development of the high pressure processes that are required to produce these materials."

Bundy was the author or co-author of over 100 scientific publications. He was elected in 1946 a Fellow of the Acoustical Society of America and in 1953 a Fellow of the American Physical Society. In 1987 he received the Bridgman Award.

Bundy gained considerable fame as a glider pilot. (His wife Hazel Bundy was also a glider pilot.) He logged over 8,000 glider flights, designed and built sailplanes, worked as an instructor and flight examiner, was very active in competitions, and sometimes served as a contest official. In 2001 he was inducted into the Hall of Fame of the National Soaring Museum.

On October 24, 1936 in Springfield, Illinois, he married Hazel Victoria Forwood (1910–2006). They had two sons and two daughters.

Selected publications
  (over 1350 citations)

References

External links
 
 
 

1910 births
2008 deaths
20th-century American physicists
21st-century American physicists
20th-century American inventors
21st-century American inventors
American glider pilots
General Electric people
People from Columbus, Ohio
Otterbein University alumni
Ohio State University alumni
Ohio University faculty
Scientists from Ohio
Fellows of the Acoustical Society of America
Fellows of the American Physical Society